Dean Emerson (born 27 December 1962) is an English former professional footballer who made 383 appearances in the Football League playing as a midfielder for Stockport County (167 league matches in two spells), Rotherham United, Coventry City (114 top-flight matches), Hartlepool United and Preston North End. He also played non-league football for East Manchester, Chorley, VS Rugby, Hinckley United and Stafford Rangers.

He was a Coventry City player when they reached the 1987 FA Cup Final but missed the match because of injury.

References

1960 births
Living people
Footballers from Salford
Footballers from Greater Manchester
English footballers
Association football midfielders
Stockport County F.C. players
Rotherham United F.C. players
Coventry City F.C. players
Hartlepool United F.C. players
Preston North End F.C. players
Chorley F.C. players
Rugby Town F.C. players
Hinckley United F.C. players
Stafford Rangers F.C. players
English Football League players
Northern Premier League players
Southern Football League players